Dolichoderus ypsilon is a species of ant in the genus Dolichoderus. Described by Forel in 1902, the species is found in areas in Western Australia in Australia.

References

Dolichoderus
Hymenoptera of Australia
Insects described in 1902